Gerhard Struber (born 24 January 1977) is an Austrian professional football manager and former player who is the current head coach of Major League Soccer club New York Red Bulls.

Playing career
As a midfielder, Struber spent most of his career at SV Austria Salzburg from 1995 to 2001. He won the Austrian Bundesliga in the 1996–97 season with Salzburg and the Austrian Super Cup in 1997. Upon retiring as a footballer in 2008, Struber had played with several less prominent clubs.

Coaching career

Red Bull Salzburg
After working two years as trainer for software systems, then eight years in sales and management positions at an insurance company, Struber quit his job to focus on coaching football teams in 2014. He already worked part time as co-trainer in the academy of FC Red Bull Salzburg from mid-2007 to mid-2010, and as coach of fourth division side SV Kuchl for 20 months. In 2014, Struber started working full time as under-15 coach at the Red Bull Salzburg academy.

FC Liefering
In June 2017, he became coach of FC Liefering alongside Janusz Góra. Struber was also coach of the Red Bull Salzburg team in the 2017–18 UEFA Youth League, where the defending champions were eliminated in the round of 16. In the 2018–19 season, he took full charge of Liefering, but left in January to focus on taking his UEFA Pro Licence.

Wolfsberger AC
Struber became the new manager of Wolfsberger AC for the 2019–20 season. Wolfsberg was ranked in third place after 14 games, same as the season before, and gathered four points out of four games in the 2019–20 UEFA Europa League before Struber left the club.

Barnsley
On 20 November 2019, Struber was appointed as manager of EFL Championship side Barnsley, penning a two-year deal. He succeeded Daniel Stendel. Barnsley were bottom of the league, seven points away from safety. They were consigned to the relegation zone for most of the 2019–20 campaign. With two stoppage time wins against Nottingham Forest and Brentford at the end of the season, Struber guided Barnsley to securing Championship football for a second successive season. It was helped by Wigan Athletic falling into administration and getting 12 points deduction. For the 2020–21 season Struber strived to get a stable team, as he did not want to be in the relegation zone again and had ambitious goals for the future of the club.

New York Red Bulls
On 6 October 2020, Struber was appointed as head coach of Major League Soccer side New York Red Bulls. The Red Bulls paid an undisclosed amount to his former club Barnsley in order to sign him. Struber made his coaching debut for the club in a 3–2 MLS Cup Playoffs loss against the Columbus Crew on 21 November.

Managerial statistics

Honours
SV Austria Salzburg
Austrian Football Bundesliga: 1996–97
Austrian Super Cup: 1997

References

External links

Gerhard Struber at fussballoesterreich.at 

Gerhard Struber at thefinalball.com

1977 births
Living people
Austrian footballers
Austria youth international footballers
FC Red Bull Salzburg players
FC Admira Wacker Mödling players
BSV Bad Bleiberg players
LASK players
SC Schwanenstadt players
Austrian Football Bundesliga players
Association football midfielders
Austrian football managers
Austrian expatriate football managers
FC Liefering managers
Wolfsberger AC managers
Barnsley F.C. managers
New York Red Bulls coaches
Expatriate football managers in England
Expatriate soccer managers in the United States
Austrian Football Bundesliga managers
English Football League managers
Austrian expatriate sportspeople in England
Austrian expatriate sportspeople in the United States
People from Hallein District
Footballers from Salzburg (state)